Sir Henry Vane-Tempest, 2nd Baronet (25 January 1771 – 1 August 1813) was a British politician. In early life his name was Henry Vane. He changed his name to Vane-Tempest when he inherited from his uncle John Tempest, Jr. in 1793.

Life
He was the son and heir of Reverend Sir Henry Vane, 1st Baronet and his wife, Frances, daughter of John Tempest, Sr.

Vane was Member of Parliament (MP) for the City of Durham from 1794 to 1800, replacing his uncle John Tempest, Jr., who died in a riding accident in 1793. Vane inherited the Tempest estates in County Durham (notably Wynyard and Brancepeth) upon condition he adopt the name and arms of Tempest. He therefore changed his surname to Vane-Tempest.

He accepted the Chiltern Hundreds in 1800 before returning to Parliament as representative for the County Durham from 1807 until his death from apoplexy in 1813. He was appointed High Sheriff of Antrim in 1805.

Vane-Tempest inherited his father's baronetcy in 1794. He was appointed lieutenant-colonel of the Durham volunteer cavalry in early 1797. He is buried at Long Newton.

Vane-Tempest was a renowned sportsman of his day, owning the celebrated racehorse Hambletonian. In a match with Mr. Cookson's Diamond over the Beacon Course at Newmarket in 1799, Hambletonian won by a neck, Sir Henry having wagered 3,000 guineas on the outcome. The aftermath is the subject of George Stubbs' painting "Hambletonian Rubbing Down", which is preserved at Mount Stewart.

Family
On 25 April 1799, Vane-Tempest married Anne MacDonnell, 2nd Countess of Antrim and they had one child, Lady Frances Anne Vane-Tempest (1800–1865). On Vane-Tempest's death without a male heir in 1813, the baronetcy became extinct. The surname Vane, however, was preserved as he had stipulated in his last will and testament that Frances Anne must keep her surname and her future husband must adopt hers in lieu of his own in order to inherit the extensive landholdings. This provision was complied with when Frances Anne married Lord Charles William Stewart in 1819. Charles William Stewart became Charles William Vane and the name Vane ultimately passed into the family of the Marquesses of Londonderry.

References

External links 
 

1771 births
1813 deaths
Baronets in the Baronetage of Great Britain
High Sheriffs of Antrim
Members of the Parliament of Great Britain for City of Durham
Members of the Parliament of the United Kingdom for City of Durham
British MPs 1790–1796
British MPs 1796–1800
UK MPs 1807–1812
UK MPs 1812–1818
Henry
Henry